Harry Boniface Prabhu is an Indian quadriplegic wheelchair tennis player, one of the pioneers of the sport in India and a medal winner at the 1998 World Championships. He was awarded the Padma Shree, the fourth highest civilian award, by the Government of India, in 2014.

Biography
Boniface Prabhu was born to Harry J. Prabhu and Fathima Prabhu, on 14 May 1972, at Bangalore, in the south Indian state of Karnataka, as a normal child like his two brothers, Jerry and George. The tragedy struck at the age of four, when a blotched lumbar puncture made him a quadriplegic for the rest of his life. However, he was brought up by his parents as a normal boy, sending him to institutions for normal children which helped the young Boniface to take up life as any competitive person would.

Boniface Prabhu is the founder of a trust, Boniface Prabhu Wheelchair Tennis Academy, based in Bangalore, with the aim of promoting the physically and intellectually disabled people and providing them with opportunities to nurture their talents. The academy provides free sports training to differently enabled people.

He took to the cause of PWDs with ThumbsUp by driving 3,500 km from Kashmir to Kanyakumari.

Boniface is married to Christina and the couple has a daughter, Simone Diya.

Sporting career
Though Boniface's principal claim to fame is wheelchair tennis, he has excelled in other disciplines, too. He has represented India, at International events, in six disciplines, over 50 times. These include athletics, shot put, badminton, javelin throw, table tennis, shooting and discus throw, apart from wheelchair tennis. His foray into international sports was at the 1996 World Wheelchair Games, UK where he won gold medal in shot put and silver medal in discus throw. Two years later, he repeated the feat at the 1998 Paralympics World Championships, participating in javelin, shot put and discus throws. He is the first Indian to win a medal in the International Paralympic Games.

Tennis career 

Boniface Prabhu was fascinated with tennis at an early age when he used to be a fan of Ivan Lendl and John Macenroe. During his participation of the World Wheelchair Athletic Meet of 1996 in the UK, he chanced upon a game of wheelchair tennis and developed an instant liking to it. On returning to India, he approached Karnataka State Lawn Tennis Association for permission to use their courts for practice which he was granted. He talked to a local tennis coach and impressed upon him to teach him the game. He was a fast learner and in two years time, he started participating in tournaments.

 Winner - Sydney International Wheelchair Tennis Championship - 2007
 Winner - Singles - Florida open - 2004
 Winner - Doubles - Florida open - 2004
 Runner-up - Sydney International Wheelchair Open Tennis - 2003
 Quarter finalist - Australian Open International Wheelchair Tennis - 2003
 Winner - Japan Open Wheelchair Tennis Championship - 2001
 Winner - Sydney International Wheelchair Tennis Championship - 1999
 Runner up - Australian Open - 1999
 Semi finalist Singles - US Open - 1998
 Semi finalist Doubles - US Open - 1998

Boniface has reached a career best world ranking of 17 in singles and 19 in doubles. He has been the highest ranked player in Asia in 2011, present ranking being no. 2. He is the no. 1 player in India. He has won 11 career titles and has featured in the finals of all the grand slam tournaments.

Awards and recognitions
 Padma Shri - Government of India - 2014
 Prathiba Bhushan
 Rising Star of the Millennium Award
 Ekalavya Award - Government of Karnataka - 2004
 Rajyotsava Award - Government of Karnataka - 2003
 Swabhiman Appreciation Award - Daijiworld Weekly - 2011

Boniface is the brand ambassador of India for wheelchair sports. He is also the brand ambassador for many commercial products.

Arjuna award controversy
In 2005, The Ministry of Youth Affairs and Sports, Government of India, reportedly informed Boniface that he had been selected for Arjuna Award, the second highest award for excellence in sports, given by the Government of India. However, when the awards were announced, Boniface did not feature in the list. It was repeated for two years and in 2007, the apparent negligence yielded comments in the media. Boniface himself wondered why physically disabled sportspersons were being ignored. He has not received the Arjuna award till date.

See also

 ITF Wheelchair Tennis Tour
 Wheelchair Tennis Masters
 List of quad wheelchair tennis champions

References

External links
 

1972 births
Living people
Recipients of the Padma Shri in sports
Recipients of the Ekalavya Award
Racket sportspeople from Bangalore
Indian people with disabilities
Wheelchair tennis players
Indian male tennis players
Recipients of the Rajyotsava Award 2003